Channarong Ratanaseangsuang (born 1939), also known as Ratana, is a former badminton player and coach who represented both Thailand and Canada in international competition.

Career 
With a game marked by impressive mobility and consistency, during the 1960s he rated among the world's elite singles players. He reached the final of the prestigious All-England Championship in 1963, the semifinals in both 1964 and 1965, and won the open championships of Canada (1964, 1965) and the United States (1964, 1968). Channarong played a leading role on the Thai Thomas Cup (men's international) teams of 1961 and 1964 that finished second and third in the world respectively.

In the mid-1960s he moved from Thailand to North America, settling permanently in Canada after studying in the US. As a player-coach he represented Canada in three Thomas Cup campaigns (1970, 1973, 1976) and won both Canadian national and Canadian Open men's doubles titles with former Thai teammate Raphi Kanchanaraphi before retiring from high level competition.

Coaching 
As a coach, he led the Canadian National team from 1967 to 1973 and again from 1979 to 1986. Channarong also mentored the Canadian players during the BWF World Championships in 1980, 1983 and 1985; the Commonwealth Games of 1970, 1982 and 1986; the Uber Cup in 1981 and 1984; the Thomas Cup in 1970, 1976 and 1986; and the Olympic Games in 1996.

Achievements

Southeast Asian Peninsular Games 
Men's singles

International tournaments 
Men's singles

Men's doubles

Mixed doubles

Honours 
Due to his achievements in badminton, he has been inducted to the Sports Hall of Fame in Sweden, Thailand and the United States. He was presented with the Vanier Award for Outstanding Young Canadian in 1978, and received the Alberta 3M Coaching Award in 1997, the Government of Canada Certificate of Merit in 1987, and the International Badminton Federation Meritorious Service Award in 1988.

References 

Channarong Ratanaseangsuang
Canadian male badminton players
1939 births
Living people
Asian Games medalists in badminton
Badminton players at the 1962 Asian Games
Badminton players at the 1966 Asian Games
Channarong Ratanaseangsuang
Channarong Ratanaseangsuang
Southeast Asian Games medalists in badminton
Channarong Ratanaseangsuang
Medalists at the 1962 Asian Games
Medalists at the 1966 Asian Games
Competitors at the 1961 Southeast Asian Peninsular Games